Chai Hansen (born Surachai Romruen, February 8, 1989) is a Thai-Australian actor. He is best known for his role as Monkey in The New Legends of Monkey, Zac in Mako Mermaids, Ilian in The 100 and Jordan Kyle in Shadowhunters.

Early life

Hansen was born in Ko Samui, an island in the Gulf of Thailand in 1989. He was born to a Thai father, Superut Romruen and an Australian mother, Sandra Hansen. At the age of 7 Hansen migrated to Australia with his mother and sister (Sarah Romruen) to seek a higher education.

Career
In 2011, it was announced that Hansen would join the cast of internationally distributed series Mako Mermaids. In season 2 onwards, he and Alex Cubis portrayed mermen, alongside Isabel Durant and Lucy Fry who portrayed mermaids.

Hansen was cast in role in the recurring role of Ilian in the fourth season of The 100. He was then cast as Monkey in The New Legends of Monkey, a new spin on classic tale Journey to the West.

In early 2018, Hansen was cast in a recurring role in Shadowhunters: The Mortal Instruments third season as Jordan Kyle, a werewolf on a quest for redemption.

In May 2021, Hansen was cast as a series regular in the  Amazon series Night Sky, playing the role of Jude.

Filmography

References

External links
 

1989 births
Living people
21st-century Australian male actors
Australian people of Thai descent
Chai Hansen
Chai Hansen
Australian actors of Asian descent